State Batteries in Western Australia were government owned and run ore-crushing facilities for the gold mining industry.  Western Australia was the only Australian state to provide batteries to assist gold prospectors and small mines. They existed in almost all of the mineral fields of Western Australia.

State Batteries were gold batteries where ore was crushed to separate gold ore. Stamp mills were gauged by the number of heads they had in operation for the crushing of ore.

Many of the government operated batteries had very short operating times, some for a year or two, while a few were 50 years or more in operation.  They were part of the Western Australian Department of Mines operations.

Origins
The first private battery in Kalgoorlie was constructed at the Croesus mine in 1894.
As early as 1897 there was consideration of ore-crushing facilities being funded by private or government means.
The first government battery was constructed at Norseman in 1898. But by 1906 there was a Batteries Inquiry Board.

Decline
In the 1930s, despite the depression, a significant number still operated.
There were close to 100 operating Batteries in Western Australia – either private or Government in 1949, and by 1958 there were less than 50. Currently there are no operating batteries.

By 1982 a Government review of State Battery operations eventuated in a functional review, and the eventual closure of State Batteries in 1987.

List
The following State Batteries are known to have existed in Western Australia.

Bamboo 1913–1962
Black Range- see Sandstone
Bulong 1898–1899
Carlaminda
Coolgardie 1904
Cue 1919–1968
Darlot 1901-1980s
Desdemona 1909–1912
Devon 1908–?
Donnybrook 1900–1904
Duketon 1905–1907
Dumpling Gully  /–?
Kalgoorlie 1932
Kalpini 1906–1911
Laverton 1902 Known to be operating between 1916 and 1941.
Leonora 1898
Linden 1908
Marble Bar 1910–?
Marvel Loch – Known to be operating between 1912 and 1950
Meekatharra 1901–?
Messenger's Patch 1909–?
Menzies 1904 – ?
Mt Egerton State Battery 1912–1921
Mt Ida 1898–1953
Mt Jackson 1912–1921
Mt Keith 1913–1928
Mt Sir Samuel 1910–1921
Mulline 1898–1921
Mulwarrie 1901–1920
Nannine 1907–1912 
Niagara 1900–1922
Norseman 1898–?  modernised in 1950 
Ora Banda 1913–?
Paddington 1903–?
Paynes Find 1912–?
Paynesville 1900–1902
Pig well 1904–1912
Pinjin 1905–1914
Quinns 1911–1920
Randalls 1905–1908
Ravelstone-Peak Hill 1917–1965
Ravensthorpe ? –
Sandstone 1911
Southern Cross 1903–1905
Tuckabianna 1918–?
Tuckanurra 1898–1923 
Warriedar 1940 ?
Widgiemooltha 1900–1911
Wiluna 1904–1950
Yalgoo 1898–1941
Yarri 1905–?
Yerilla 1898–1920
Youanmi 1909–1940
Yundamindera 1903–1907

See also
 Hints to Prospectors and Owners of Treatment Plants

References

Gold mining in Western Australia
Stamp mills